Fuxingmen is the name of a gate that used to be a part of Beijing's old city wall.  It is also the name of a road situated in central Beijing and on the northwestern stretch of the 2nd Ring Road.

Origin 
Fuxingmen means "Gate of Revival". An overpass over the ring road exists with the same name.

Beijing subway lines 1 and 2 have an interchange stop at Fuxingmen Station.  Several public buses serve the area as well.

The commercial centres of Xidan and Beijing Financial Street are not far away. Fuxingmen also marks the western end of Fuxingmen Inner Street, which is a western extension of West Chang'an Avenue, and the eastern starting point of Fuxingmen Outer Street.

Streets
 Fuxingmen Inner Street
 Fuxingmen Outer Street
 , part of 2nd Ring Road (Beijing)
 , part of 2nd Ring Road (Beijing)

Road transport in Beijing
Roads in China
Neighbourhoods of Beijing
Xicheng District